Torbjørn Sindballe (born 21 October 1976) is a Danish professional triathlete who was forced to end his competition triathlon career due to heart problems. Torbjørn Sindballe lives in northern Sjælland with his wife Mette, and their 5-year-old son Oskar.

Particular physique

Thorbjørn Sindballe weighs in at 80 kg and is 190 cm tall, which is an unusual size for an elite triathlete. His size makes him less aerodynamic, heavier for running, and makes it harder for him to endure the heat, which is a strong factor in several important competitions.

Triathlon career

He had his first career breakthrough when he won the Danish and Nordic Championships in 1998, and next year won World Championship Silver. However, his career has been plagued by injuries but he somehow has still managed a very healthy career, with many impressive results, including:

1st ITU  Long Distance Triathlon World Championship (Canberra) 2006
1st Half Ironman Triathlon Port Macguarie 2006
1st Ironman 70.3 California 2005
1st ITU Long Distance Triathlon World Championship (Sater) 2004
1st ITU Long Distance Triathlon European Championship 2003
2nd Ironman Florida 2008
3rd Challenge Roth 2008
3rd Ironman New Zealand 2007
3rd Ironman Hawaii 2007
2nd Wildfire Triathlon(San Antonio) 2005
2nd Ironman Wisconsin 2003
3rd Ironman 70.3 California 2003
2nd ITU Long Distance Triathlon World Championship (Nice) 2002
2nd ITU Long Distance Triathlon World Championship (Sater) 1999

Racing in the heat

The thing that Torbjørn believes held him back from success in the Ironman Hawaii is his body's inability to handle the heat. To deal with this problem, he has developed, in cooperation with his sponsor Craft of Scandinavia, several methods to endure the heat more effectively: including running in all white, while soaked in water, as well as a glove filled with ice, to cool him down.

End of competitive triathlon career

Torbjørn Sindballe was forced to announce end to his competitive triathlon career on 30 June 2009, due to a bicuspid aortic valve.

External links
 Thorbjørn Sindballe official website

1976 births
Danish male triathletes
Living people